Clanculus is a genus of sea snail, marine gastropod molluscs of the family Trochidae, the top shells.

Distribution
Clanculus is an old genus. Fossils found in Italy date from the Pliocene (C. corallinus, C. elevatus, C. bonfittoi, C. jussieui) The distribution of this genus is worldwide, individuals of some species sometimes occur in great numbers, from the intertidal zone up to depths of 200 m. Many species can be found in Australia, New Zealand, the Indo-Pacific, Philippines, Sri Lanka, Seychelles, Japan, South Africa, Zanzibar, Indian Ocean, the Red Sea, West Africa, Angola, North Africa and Europe.

Shell description
These top shells are wide-conical and low spired. Their spirally ribbed sculpture consists of conspicuous regular rows of  robust, round beads. The whorls show a profile with a deep suture and the final whorl inflated. The aperture of the shell is oval, with a strongly ridged lip. The umbilicus is generally deep. The color of the shell varies between orange, dark red, and chocolate brown.

Species
The type species, Clanculus pharaonius, was described by Carl Linnaeus in 1758 as Trochus pharaonius.

Subgenus Clanculus (Paraclanculus) Finlay, 1926
 Clanculus (Paraclanculus) peccatus (Finlay, 1926)

 † Clanculus adesus (Marwick, 1931) 
 Clanculus albanyensis Jansen, 1995
 Clanculus albinus  A. Adams, 1853 
 Clanculus albugo (Watson, 1880)
 Clanculus aloysii Tenison Woods, 1876
 Clanculus ater Pilsbry, 1911
 Clanculus atricatena J.R. Tomlin, 1921
 Clanculus atropurpureus A.A. Gould 1849
 Clanculus atypicus Iredale, 1912
 †  Clanculus baccatus (Defrance 1824) 
 Clanculus bathyraphe (E. A. Smith, 1862)
 Clanculus berthelotii (d'Orbigny, 1840)
 Clanculus bicarinatus Angas, 1880
 Clanculus boyeti Poppe, Tagaro & Dekker, 2006
 † Clanculus brebioni Landau, Van Dingenen & Ceulemans, 2017 
 Clanculus bronni (R.W. Dunker, 1860)
 Clanculus brunneus  A. Adams, 1853 
 Clanculus buijsei Poppe, Tagaro & Dekker, 2006
 Clanculus ceylonicus G.& H. Nevill, 1869
 Clanculus clanguloides  Wood, 1828 
 Clanculus clangulus (Wood, 1828)
 Clanculus cognatus (Pilsbry, 1903)
 Clanculus comarilis Ch. Hedley, 1912
 Clanculus consobrinus R. Tate, 1893 
 Clanculus corallinus (Gmelin, 1791)
 Clanculus cristinae Rubio & Rolan, 2002
 Clanculus cruciatus (Linnaeus, 1758)
 Clanculus denticulatus (Gray, 1827)
 Clanculus depictus A. Adams, 1854
 Clanculus dunkeri (Koch, 1843)
 Clanculus edentulus A. Adams, 1853 
 Clanculus escondidus Poppe, Tagaro & Vilvens, 2009
 Clanculus eucarinatus Monfort 1810
 Clanculus euchelioides R. Tate, 1893 
 Clanculus flagellatus (Philippi, 1848)
 Clanculus floridus (Philippi, 1850)
 Clanculus flosculus Fischer, 1880
 Clanculus gemmulifer H. A. Pilsbry, 1901
 Clanculus granti Ch. Hedley, 1907
 Clanculus guineensis Gmelin, 1791
 Clanculus johnstoni  Ch. Hedley, 1917 
 Clanculus jucundus Gould, 1861
 Clanculus jussieui (Payraudeau, 1826)
 Clanculus kinzelbachi   F. Nordsieck, 1982 
 Clanculus korkosi Singer et al., 2000
 Clanculus kraussii (Philippi, 1846)
 Clanculus largillierti (Philippi, 1849)
 Clanculus laurae Cecalupo, Buzzurro & Mariani, 2008
 Clanculus leucomphalus  Verco, 1905 
 Clanculus limbatus (Quoy & Gaimard, 1834) 
 Clanculus margaritarius (Philippi, 1849)
 Clanculus mariaemaris Rubio & Rolan, 2002
 Clanculus maugeri (Wood, 1828)
 Clanculus mauritianus Melvill, 1909
 Clanculus maxillatus (C.T. Menke, 1843)
 Clanculus microdon Monfort 1810
 Clanculus miniatus (H.E. Anton, 1839)
 Clanculus minor A. Adams, 1853
 Clanculus mixtus E.A. Smith, 1903
 Clanculus multipunctatus Jansen, 1995
 Clanculus natalensis Herbert, 1993
 Clanculus nigricans A. Adams, 1853: Incertae sedis
 Clanculus ormophorus A. Adams, 1854
 Clanculus persicus Habe & Shikama, 1964
 Clanculus personatus (Philippi, 1846)
 Clanculus petziae Rubio & Rolan, 2002
 Clanculus pharaonius (Linnaeus, 1758)
 Clanculus philippii (Koch, 1843)
 Clanculus pini Rubio & Rolan, 2002
 Clanculus plebejus (Philippi, 1851)
 Clanculus providentiae (Melvill, 1909) 
 Clanculus pseudocorallinus  Gofas, 1984 
 Clanculus puniceus (Philippi, 1846) 
 Clanculus quadricingulatus Ludbrook N.H., 1941
 Clanculus rarus (Dufo, 1840) (nomen dubium)
 Clanculus richeri Vilvens, 2000
 Clanculus ringens C.T. Menke, 1843
 Clanculus robertsi Pilsbry, 1889
 Clanculus rubicundus Dunker, 1871
 Clanculus samoensis (Hombron & Jacquinot, 1848)
 † Clanculus sancticlementensis Landau, Van Dingenen & Ceulemans, 2017
 Clanculus santamariae Gofas, 1984
 Clanculus scabrosus (Philippi, 1850)
 Clanculus scotti Poppe, Tagaro & Dekker, 2006
 Clanculus simoni Poppe, Tagaro & Dekker, 2006
 Clanculus spadiceus Philippi, 1848
 Clanculus stigmatarius A. Adams, 1853
 Clanculus thomasi (Crosse, 1864)
 Clanculus tonnerrei (G. Nevill & H. Nevill, 1874)
 † Clanculus umbilicovadus Landau, Van Dingenen & Ceulemans, 2017 
 Clanculus undatoides  J. E. Tennison-Woods, 1879 
 Clanculus undatus (Lamarck, 1816)
 Clanculus villanus (Philippi, 1846)
 Clanculus waltonae Sowerby, 1892
 Clanculus weedingi Cotton, 1938

Species brought into synonymy 
 Clanculus alfredensis Bartsch, 1915: synonym of Clanculus miniatus (Anton, 1838)
 Clanculus angeli Tenison-Woods, 1877: synonym of Clanculus plebejus (Philippi, 1852)
 Clanculus assabensis Caramagna, 1888 : synonym of Clanculus tonnerrei (G. Nevill & H. Nevill, 1874)
 Clanculus becki Turton, 1932: synonym of Clanculus miniatus (Anton, 1838)
 Clanculus bicrenatus Gould, 1849: synonym of Trochus bicrenatus Gould, 1849 
 Clanculus blainvillii Cantraine, 1842: synonym of Clanculus jussieui (Payraudeau, 1826)
 Clanculus blandus Dunker, 1865 (nomen nudum): synonym of Clanculus stigmatarius A. Adams, 1853 
 Clanculus callicoccus (Philippi, 1849): synonym of Trochus callicoccus Philippi, 1849 
 Clanculus capensis (Gmelin, 1791): synonym of Gibbula capensis (Gmelin, 1791)
 Clanculus carinatus A. Adams, 1853: synonym of Clanculus miniatus (Anton, 1838)
 Clanculus cariniferus (Beck in Reeve, 1842): synonym of Trochus cariniferus Reeve, 1842
 Clanculus clippertonensis Hertlein & Emerson 1953: synonym of Homalopoma clippertonense (Hertlein & Emerson, 1953) 
 Clanculus concavus (Gmelin): synonym of Infundibulum concavum (Gmelin, 1791) 
 Clanculus conspersus  A. Adams, 1853  : synonym of Clanculus philippi (Koch in Philippi, 1843)
 Clanculus couturii Payraudeau, 1826: synonym of Clanculus corallinus (Gmelin, 1791) 
 Clanculus crassilabrum Sowerby III,1905: synonym of Herpetopoma crassilabrum (G. B. Sowerby III, 1905) 
 Clanculus danieli Crosse, 1862: synonym of  Eurytrochus danieli (Crosse, 1862)
 Clanculus dominicanus Tenison-Woods, 1877: synonym of Clanculus plebejus (Philippi, 1852)
 Clanculus elevatus Turton, 1932: synonym of Clanculus miniatus (Anton, 1838)
 Clanculus eucosmia Turton, 1932: synonym of Clanculus miniatus (Anton, 1838)
 Clanculus gatliffi Tomlin, 1924: synonym of Clanculus euchelioides Tate, 1893
 Clanculus gemmatus Gould, 1845: synonym of Euchelus gemmatus (Gould, 1845) 
 Clanculus gennesi Fischer, 1901  : synonym of Clanculus tonnerrei (G. Nevill & H. Nevill, 1874)
 Clanculus gibbonsi  Sowerby  : synonym of Clanculus tonnerrei (G. Nevill & H. Nevill, 1874)
 Clanculus gibbosus A. Adams, 1853: synonym of Clanculus floridus (Philippi, 1850)
 Clanculus granosus  J. Brazier, 1877  : synonym of Clanculus bronni Dunker, 1860
 Clanculus granoliratus  Monterosato, 1889 : synonym of Clanculus jussieui (Payraudeau, 1826)
 Clanculus hizenensis Pilsbry, 1901: synonym of Clanculus bronni Dunker, 1860
 Clanculus howeinsulae Salisbury, 1936: synonym of Clanculus thomasi (Crosse, 1862)
 Clanculus kochii Philippi, 1844: synonym of Trochus kochii Philippi, 1844
 Clanculus kowiensis Turton, 1932: synonym of Clanculus miniatus (Anton, 1838)
 Clanculus kraussi Philippi in Martini & Chemnitz, 1849 : synonym of Clanculus atricatena Tomlin, 1921
 Clanculus laceyi G. B. Sowerby, 1889: synonym of Clanculus miniatus (Anton, 1838)
 Clanculus maculosus A. Adams, 1853: synonym of Clanculus limbatus (Quoy & Gaimard, 1834)
 Clanculus microdon ater  H. A. Pilsbry, 1911 : synonym of Clanculus ater Pilsbry, 1901 
 Clanculus miniatus (Anton, 1838) sensu Macnae & Kalk, 1969: synonym of Clanculus puniceus (Philippi, 1846)
  Clanculus miniatus auct.: synonym of Clanculus waltonae Sowerby III, 1892
 Clanculus nodiliratus A. Adams, 1853: synonym of Clanculus plebejus (Philippi, 1852)
 Clanculus nodulosus A. Adams, 1855: synonym of Trochus ferreirai Bozzetti, 1996
 Clanculus ochroleucus (Philippi, 1853): synonym of Clanculus albanyensis Jansen, 1995 
 Clanculus omalomphalus A. Adams, 1853: synonym of Clanculus brunneus Adams, 1853
 Clanculus patagonicus d'Orbigny, 1835: synonym of Tegula patagonica (d'Orbigny, 1835) 
 Clanculus peccatus (Finlay, 1927): synonym of Clanculus (Paraclanculus) peccatus (Finlay, 1926)
 Clanculus philomenae Tenison-Woods, 1876: synonym of Clanculus philippi (Koch in Philippi, 1843)
 Clanculus plabeius Pritchard & Gatliff, 1902: synonym of Clanculus plebejus (Philippi, 1852)
 Clanculus puniceus (Linnaeus, 1758): synonym of Clanculus atricatena Tomlin, 1921
 Clanculus purpuratus Pilsbry, 1889: synonym of Clanculus philippi (Koch in Philippi, 1843)
 Clanculus radiatus Gmelin, 1791: synonym of Trochus radiatus Gmelin, 1791 
 Clanculus raphaeli Tenison-Woods, 1877: synonym of Clanculus philippi (Koch in Philippi, 1843)
 Clanculus rotellina  A. A. Gould, 1849 : synonym of Camitia rotellina (Gould, 1849) 
 Clanculus rubens  ("A. Adams") Angas, 1865: synonym of Clanculus dunkeri Koch in Philippi, 1843 
 Clanculus samoensis Rousseau in Hombron, J.B. & C.H. Jacquinot, 1877: synonym of Clanculus atropurpureus (Gould, 1849) 
 Clanculus septenarius (Melvill & Standen, 1899): synonym of Pulchrastele septenaria (Melvill & Standen, 1899)
 Clanculus trochiformis Turton, 1932: synonym of Clanculus miniatus (Anton, 1838)
 Clanculus unedo (A. Adams, 1853): synonym of Clanculus margaritarius (Philippi, 1846)
 Clanculus variegatus A. Adams, 1853: synonym of Clanculus limbatus (Quoy & Gaimard, 1834)
 Clanculus yatesii Crosse, 1863: synonym of Clanculus philippii (Koch in Philippi, 1843)
 Clanculus zebrides A. Adams, 1853: synonym of Clanculus brunneus Adams, 1853

References

 NZ Mollusca
 Powell A. W. B., New Zealand Mollusca, William Collins Publishers Ltd, Auckland, New Zealand 1979 
 Checklist
 Blainville, H.M.D., 1817. Dictionnaire des Sciences Naturelles dans lequel on traite méthodiquement des différens êtres de la nature.
 Pilsbry, H.A., 1889. Manual of Conchology vol. XI Academy of Natural Sciences Philadelphia, Philadelphia. 1-519, pls 1-67
 Satyamurti, S.T., 1952. Mollusca of Krusadai Is. I. Amphineura and Gastropoda. Bull. Madras Govt. Mus.; Nat. Hist.n.s., 1(2)(6):1-267.
 Ludbrook, N. H., 1956. The molluscan fauna of the Pliocene strata underlying the Adelaide Plains. Part 3. Scaphopoda, Polyplacophora, Gastropoda (Haliotidae to Tornidae). Trans. R. Soc. SA, 79:1-36
 Cotton, B.C., 1959. South Australian Mollusca. Archaeogastropoda . South Australian Government Printer, Adelaide. 1-449.
 Iredale, T. & McMichael, D.F., 1962 [31/Dec/1962]. A reference list of the marine Mollusca of New South Wales. Mem. Aust. Mus., 11:0-0
 Macpherson, J.H. & Gabriel, C.J., 1962. Marine Mollusca of Victoria. Melbourne Univ. Press, Melbourne. 475.
 Ladd, H.S., 1966 [31/Dec/1966]. Chitons and gastropods (Haliotidae through Adeorbidae) from the western Pacific Islands. United States Geological Survey, Professional Pape, 531:0-0
 Rajagopal, A.S. & Mookherjee, H.P., 1978. Contributions to the molluscan fauna of India. Pt. I. Marine molluscs of the Coromandel Coast, Palk Strait and Gulf of Mannar - Gastropoda: Archaeogastropoda. Rec. Zool. Surv. India, 12:1-48
 Herbert G.G. (1993). Revision of the Trochinae, tribe Trochini (Gastropoda: Trochidae) of southern Africa. Annals of the natal Museum 34(2):239-308
 Wilson, B., 1993. Australian Marine Shells. Prosobranch Gastropods. Odyssey Publishing, Kallaroo, WA
 Jansen, P., 1995 [July 1995]. A review of the genus Clanculus Montfort, 1810 (Gastropoda: Trochidae) in Australia, with description of a new subspecies and the introduction of a nomen novum. Vita Marina, 43(1-2):39-62.
 Gofas, S.; Le Renard, J.; Bouchet, P. (2001). Mollusca, in: Costello, M.J. et al. (Ed.) (2001). European register of marine species: a check-list of the marine species in Europe and a bibliography of guides to their identification. Collection Patrimoines Naturels, 50: pp. 180–213

External links 

 
Trochidae
Gastropod genera